Main Street is a satirical novel written by Sinclair Lewis, and published in 1920.

The story is set in the small town of Gopher Prairie, Minnesota, a fictionalized version of Sauk Centre, Minnesota, Lewis's hometown. The novel takes place in the 1910s, with references to the start of World War I, the United States' entry into the war, and the years following the end of the war, including the start of Prohibition.

Satirizing small-town life, Main Street is perhaps Sinclair Lewis's most famous book, and led in part to his eventual 1930 Nobel Prize for Literature. It relates the life and struggles of Carol Milford Kennicott as she comes into conflict with the small-town mentality of the residents of Gopher Prairie. Highly acclaimed upon publication, Main Street remains a recognized American classic.

Plot 
Carol Milford, the daughter of a judge, grew up in Mankato, Minnesota, and became an orphan in her teens. In college, she reads a book on village improvement in a sociology class and begins to dream of redesigning villages and towns. After college, she attends a library school in Chicago and is exposed to many  radical ideas and lifestyles. She becomes a librarian in Saint Paul, Minnesota, the state capital, but finds the work unrewarding. She marries Will Kennicott, a doctor, who is a small-town boy at heart.

When they marry, Will convinces her to live in his home-town of Gopher Prairie, Minnesota, a town modeled on Sauk Centre, Minnesota, the author's birthplace. Carol immediately sets about her plans to remake Gopher Prairie, but she is filled with disdain for the town's physical ugliness and smug conservatism.

She speaks with its members about progressive changes, joins women's clubs such as the Thanatopsis, distributes literature, and holds a party to liven up Gopher Prairie's inhabitants. Despite her efforts, she is ineffective and constantly derided by the leading cliques.

She finds some comfort and companionship with a variety of social outsiders in the town, but these companions all fail to live up to her expectations.

After a political meeting of the Nonpartisan League is broken up by local authorities, Carol leaves her husband and moves for a time to Washington, D.C., to become a clerk in a wartime government agency. She eventually returns. Nevertheless, Carol does not feel defeated:

I do not admit that Main Street is as beautiful as it should be! I do not admit that Gopher Prairie is greater or more generous than Europe! I do not admit that dish-washing is enough to satisfy all women! I may not have fought the good fight, but I have kept the faith. (Chapter 39)

Reception 
The book was a commercial success. It was the best-selling work of fiction in America for the year 1921, according to Publishers Weekly.

Some of Lewis's contemporaries said the novel was too bleak, even humorless, in its conveyance of ignorant small-town life and people. However, Main Street generally is considered to be Lewis's most significant and enduring work, along with its 1922 successor Babbitt.

Some small-town residents resented their portrayal, and the book was banned by the public library of Alexandria, Minnesota.

Because of the popularity acquired by Lewis and his book, high-school teams from his hometown of Sauk Centre, Minnesota, began to be called the Main Streeters as early as the 1925–26 school year. This name was essentially given to the town by the nearby towns at school events. The Sauk Centre High School still goes by the name in a tribute to Lewis.

Awards and nominations 
Main Street initially was awarded the 1921 Pulitzer Prize for literature, but was rejected by the board of trustees, who overturned the jury's decision. The prize instead went to Edith Wharton for The Age of Innocence. In 1926, Lewis refused the Pulitzer when he was awarded it for Arrowsmith.

In 1930, Lewis was the first American ever awarded the Nobel Prize in Literature. While a Nobel Prize is awarded to the author, not the work, and itself does not cite a particular work for which he was chosen, Main Street was Lewis' best-known work and enormously popular at the time. In the Nobel committee's presentation speech, both Main Street and Arrowsmith were cited. The prize was awarded "... for his vigorous and graphic art of description and his ability to create, with wit and humour, new types of characters."

In 1998, the Modern Library ranked Main Street #68 on its list of the 100 best English-language novels of the 20th century.

See also 
 Main Street — the iconic street in small-town America

Notes

External links 

 
 
 

1920 American novels
American satirical novels
Culture of Saint Paul, Minnesota
Harcourt (publisher) books
Novels by Sinclair Lewis
Novels set in Minnesota